Persicula testai is a species of sea snail, a marine gastropod mollusk, in the family Cystiscidae.

Distribution
This species occurs in the Indian Ocean off Somalia.

References

testai
Gastropods described in 1993
Cystiscidae